Grad is a village in the municipality of Delčevo, North Macedonia. It is located close to the Bulgarian border.

Demographics
According to the 2002 census, the village had a total of 534 inhabitants. Ethnic groups in the village include:

Macedonians 518
Turks 15
Serbs 1

References

Villages in Delčevo Municipality